Cape Breton Island is an island in the Canadian province of Nova Scotia, in Canada.

Cape Breton may also refer to:

Places

On Cape Breton Island
 Cape Breton, a cape at the eastern tip of Cape Breton Island, Canada
 Cape Breton Highlands, a mountain range in the north of Cape Breton Island, Canada
 Cape Breton Highlands National Park
 Cape Breton Regional Municipality, a regional municipality in Nova Scotia
 Cape Breton—Canso, a federal electoral district

In France
 Capbreton or Cap Berton, a commune of the Landes département in southwestern France

Organizations
 Cape Breton Eagles, a Sydney-based ice hockey team
 Cape Breton Post
 Cape Breton Development Corporation
 Cape Breton University

Other uses
 Cape Breton and Central Nova Scotia Railway
 Jeanneau Cape Breton, a French sailboat design

See also

 
 Breton (disambiguation)
 Cape (disambiguation)